Tuczno is a town in Wałcz County, West Pomeranian Voivodeship in the north-west of Poland.

Tuczno may also refer to the following options:

 Tuczno Drugie
 Gmina Tuczno
 Tuczno, Kuyavian-Pomeranian Voivodeship (north-central Poland)
 Tuczno, Greater Poland Voivodeship (west-central Poland)
 Tuczno, Lubusz Voivodeship (west Poland)
 Tuczno Pierwsze
 Tuczno Trzecie
 Tuczno-Wieś

See also 
 Tuczenko ( with Wilanów)